HMS Forres was a Hunt class minesweeper of the Royal Navy ordered towards the end of World War I. She was initially named Fowey but was renamed prior to launch to avoid possible confusion with coastal locations.

See also
Forres, Scotland

References
 

Hunt-class minesweepers (1916)
Royal Navy ship names
1918 ships